Podlužany is a village and municipality in the Levice District in the Nitra Region of Slovakia.

Etymology
Slovak podlužane  - people living near the riparian forest (luh). Podlusan 1275, Podlussany 1773, Podlužany 1808, Podlužany 1920.

Web page
http://www.obec-podluzany.sk/

History
In historical records the village was first mentioned in 1275.

Geography
The village lies at an altitude of 175 metres and covers an area of 8.749 km2. It has a population of about 760 people.

Ethnicity
The village is approximately 99% Slovak.

Facilities
The village has a public library and football pitch.

References

External links
http://www.statistics.sk/mosmis/eng/run.html

Villages and municipalities in Levice District